Marcel Sabitzer (born 17 March 1994) is an Austrian professional footballer who plays as a midfielder for  club Manchester United, on loan from Bayern Munich. He represents the Austria national team. Predominantly a central midfielder, Sabitzer can play in a multitude of roles, including attacking midfielder, defensive midfielder, winger and second striker.

Sabitzer began his professional career in Austria with Admira Wacker and Rapid Wien. He joined German club RB Leipzig in 2014 and was immediately loaned to Red Bull Salzburg for a season. Sabitzer made more than 200 appearances for RB Leipzig, before Bayern Munich signed him in August 2021 for a reported transfer fee of €16 million.

Sabitzer represented Austria at multiple youth international levels and made his senior international debut at the age of 18 in June 2012. He has earned more than 60 caps for Austria and played at UEFA Euro 2016 and UEFA Euro 2020.

Club career

Admira Wacker Mödling 
Sabitzer joined Admira Wacker's youth academy in July 2009, having previously played youth football for Admira Villach, Grazer AK, 1. Wiener Neustädter SC and Austria Wien.

Rapid Wien 
In January 2013, Sabitzer joined Rapid Wien on a contract until the summer of 2016 for an undisclosed transfer fee.

RB Leipzig

Loan to Red Bull Salzburg 
On 30 May 2014, Sabitzer signed a four-year contract with RB Leipzig, and was loaned for a season to FC Red Bull Salzburg.

Return to RB Leipzig 
Sabitzer returned to RB Leipzig for the 2015–16 season, when he scored eight goals in 34 appearances. On 1 April 2016, Sabitzer extended his contract until 2021.

He finished the 2016–17 season with nine goals in 33 appearances. In the 2017–18 season, he scored five goals in 34 appearances.

In the 2019–20 UEFA Champions League, Sabitzer scored his first two goals in the competition in back-to-back matches against Zenit Saint Petersburg. On 10 March 2020, he scored twice in a 3–0 win over Tottenham Hotspur in the Champions League round of 16, to help earn Leipzig a 4–0 aggregate victory and a place in the quarter-finals of the competition for the first time in club's history. Leipzig eventually lost 0–3 to Paris Saint-Germain in a semi finals match on 18 August, and were knocked out of the tournament. Sabitzer finished the 2019–20 campaign with 16 goals and 11 assists in all competitions.

Bayern Munich 
On 30 August 2021, Sabitzer signed a four-year contract with Bayern Munich for a reported transfer fee of €16 million.

Loan to Manchester United
On 1 February 2023, it was announced that Sabitzer had signed for Manchester United on loan until the end of the season. He made his debut three days later, coming on as a substitute in the Premier League win against Crystal Palace, making him the first Austrian to ever play for the club. On 26 February 2023, Sabitzer played in the 2023 EFL Cup final, coming on as a substitute in a 2–0 victory over Newcastle United. He scored his first goal for the club at the 2022–23 FA Cup quarter-finals against Fulham which ended 3–1 for United.

International career 

Sabitzer played youth international football for Austria at under-16, under-17, under-18, under-19 and under-21 levels.

He made his senior international debut for Austria at the age of 18 on 5 June 2012, in a goalless friendly against Romania.

He represented the national team at UEFA Euro 2016, and UEFA Euro 2020.

Personal life 
He is a son of former Austria international Herfried Sabitzer, and the cousin of footballer Thomas Sabitzer.

Career statistics

Club

International 

Scores and results list Austria's goal tally first, score column indicates score after each Sabitzer goal.

Honours 
Red Bull Salzburg
Austrian Bundesliga: 2014–15
Austrian Cup: 2014–15

Bayern Munich
Bundesliga: 2021–22
DFL-Supercup: 2022

Manchester United
EFL Cup: 2022–23

Individual
Austrian Footballer of the Year: 2017
UEFA Champions League Squad of the Season: 2019–20
Bundesliga Goal of the Month: February 2021
Bundesliga Team of the Season: 2019–20
kicker Bundesliga Team of the Season: 2019–20

References

External links 

 Profile at FC Bayern Munich
 
 
 
 
 

1994 births
Living people
2. Bundesliga players
2. Liga (Austria) players
Association football forwards
Association football midfielders
Association football utility players
Association football wingers
Austria international footballers
Austria under-21 international footballers
Austria youth international footballers
Austrian expatriate footballers
Austrian expatriate sportspeople in Germany
Austrian expatriate sportspeople in England
Austrian Football Bundesliga players
Austrian footballers
Austrian Regionalliga players
Bundesliga players
Premier League players
Expatriate footballers in Germany
Expatriate footballers in England
FC Admira Wacker Mödling players
FC Bayern Munich footballers
Manchester United F.C. players
FC Red Bull Salzburg players
People from Wels
RB Leipzig players
SK Rapid Wien players
Footballers from Upper Austria
UEFA Euro 2016 players
UEFA Euro 2020 players